Dance Mania is a studio album by American musician Tito Puente. The album was added to the National Recording Registry in 2002. It is also listed among the 1001 Albums You Must Hear Before You Die.

Track listing
All tracks written by Tito Puente, except where noted.

Personnel
 Tito Puente – leader, arranger, timbales, vibraphone, marimba
 Bernie Glow, Jimmy Frisaura, Frank Lo Pinto, George López, Gene Repetti, Larry Moser, León Merian – trumpet
 Rafael Palau, Jerry Sanfino, Schapp Pullman, Tony Buonpastore – saxophone
 Raymond Concepción – piano
 Bobby Rodríguez – bass
 Ray Barretto – congas
 Ray Rodríguez – bongos
 Julito Collazo – congas (tracks 4 and 11)
 Santitos Colón – lead vocals, chorus
 Vitin Avilés, Otto Olivar – chorus
 Mickey Crofford – original studio engineer

References

1958 albums
Tito Puente albums
RCA Records albums
United States National Recording Registry recordings
Mambo albums
United States National Recording Registry albums